Warning Device is the third studio album by the American pop punk band Teenage Bottlerocket.

Release
It was released on January 8, 2008 on Red Scare Records. A music video was released for "In the Basement" on February 4, 2008. The following month, the band embarked on a West Coast US tour with Dead to Me, the Femurs and Broadway Calls, which led into an East Coast tour with the Copyrights. In August 2008, the band embarked on a headlining tour of Canada with support from Riptides and the Sidekicks, followed by a handful of US shows. In October 2008, they then appeared at Riot Fest, before going on a short US tour.

Reception

Stewart Mason, in his review for AllMusic, says, "Warning Device is an album strictly for pop-punk purists", calling it "old-school pop-punk done up right, with equal emphasis on the pop side of the hyphen..." Punknews.org ranked the album at number nine on their list of the year's 20 best releases.

Track listing
 "Bottlerocket" – 0:51
 "In the Basement" – 1:56
 "Gave You My Heart" – 2:21
 "She's Not the One" – 2:08
 "Pacemaker" – 2:29
 "Social Life" – 1:58
 "Welcome to the Nuthouse" – 1:46
 "Anna's Song" – 2:06
 "On My Own" – 2:40
 "Totally Stupid" – 2:18
 "Crawling Back to You" – 2:26
 "Warning Device" – 2:29
 "Wasting Time" – 2:23

Vinyl/digital bonus track
 "I Know You Know" – 2:28

Personnel
 Ray Carlisle – guitar, vocals
 Kody Templeman – guitar, vocals
 Miguel Chen – bass
 Brandon Carlisle – drums

References

2008 albums
Teenage Bottlerocket albums
Red Scare Industries albums